Nairobi College was a small radical left junior college in East Palo Alto, California for ethnic minority students in the late 1960s.

Background 

The College was part of a movement for ethnic minority groups in the United States to have dedicated academic programs to train themselves in the theory and practice of liberation, resistance, and revolution. These programs were referred to as "Third world colleges", which sought to practice the principles of self-determination and community empowerment while teaching left-radical ideology in rejection of the perceived bourgeois ideology and white control of mainstream academic institutions. Prominent advocates for this movement included graduate student Angela Davis and professors Herbert Marcuse of the University of California San Diego and Carlos Blanco of Thurgood Marshall College. Other colleges founded as part of this movement included Malcolm X Liberation University, Uhuru Sasa Shule, the Center for Black Education,  and Thurgood Marshall College.

Description 
Nairobi College began classes in the fall of 1969 with initial funding of $100,000 donated by area residents and private foundations. 20,000 books were donated by schools, individuals, and publishers, which were kept in two residential garages. Anyone at least 16 years of age was welcome to enroll at no cost. The first class had 100 working-class students, some of whom had dropped out of high school. The all-volunteer faculty numbered about 40 and consisted of student and professors from nearby universities as well as community organizers.
Based out of a small private home in East Palo Alto, Nairobi College operated out of stores, church buildings, and homes throughout black, Latino, and Asian neighborhoods in the San Francisco Peninsula.
The college leadership hoped that spreading classes out in these existing structures would integrate it with the needs and reality of their surrounding community, calling it a "college without walls" in contrast to the perceived "ivory tower" of mainstream academia. It was a two-year college.

The students were primarily African American and Hispanic, although working-class white students were also included. Most of them worked full-time and took classes in the evenings. All students were required to utilize their training to provide skilled volunteer work three hours per week in support of area social organizations, such as schools, community health centers, and legal aid.

Instructors included Ed Roberts, a disability rights activist, Tello Nkhereanye, a leftist from South Africa, Frank Omowale Satterwhite, a community organizer, Aaron Manganello, a Marxist minister of education for the Brown Berets, and Mary Hoover, a Stanford academic advocate for African-American English.

In 1966, Nairobi College launched an affiliated preschool through high school program called the Nairobi Day School. By 1971, a $500 tuition charge was instituted, but was usually paid by federal student financial aid and was often waived.

See also 
 
 Black separatism
 Experimental college movement
 Institute of the Black World

Notes

Citations

References 

 
 
 
 
 
 

1960 establishments in California

African and Black nationalism in the United States
African studies
Defunct private universities and colleges in California

Educational institutions established in 1960
Historically black universities and colleges in the United States
Pan-Africanism in the United States
Post–civil rights era in African-American history
Universities and colleges in San Mateo County, California